Henryk from the Back Row is a German documentary film directed by Andreas Dresen. The film was released in 2012 and follows the CDU politician Henryk Wichmann as a member of the Landtag of Brandenburg.

Production 
Wichmann was previously the subject of Dresen's documentary Herr Wichmann von der CDU. After Wichmann was elected to the Landtag of Brandenburg in 2009, Dresen had the idea to direct a sequel. Dresen followed Wichmann for one parliamentary year and produced around 100 hours of uncut material, which he edited down to 1.5 hours of uncommented film.

The film premiered on February 12, 2012 at the 62nd Berlin International Film Festival in the Panorama section.

Reception 
 Filmkunstfest Mecklenburg-Vorpommern 2012: Audience award

References

External links 
 
 

2012 films
2012 documentary films
Films directed by Andreas Dresen
German documentary films
2010s German-language films
Documentary films about politics
2010s German films